Cherkady  is a village in the southern state of Karnataka, India. It is located in the Udupi taluk of Udupi district in Karnataka.

Demographics
As of 2001 India census, Cherkady had a population of 6132 with 2970 males and 3162 females.

Education 

 R.K.Patkar Higher Primary school (1 to 7 standard classes)
 Sharada High School (8 to 10 standard classes )

Geography 
Cherkady is surrounded by other villages including Aroor and Nelavara to the west, Kokkarne and Karje to the north, and Suralu and Adapadi to the east.

Culture 
Cherkady's ancient temples are Shri Durga Parameshwari temple Kannaru and Halvali Math.

Economy 
The village's economy depends on agriculture, poultry and dairy. Most farmers grow paddy and other crops. Youths are attracted to government jobs. Cashew and bidi industries are numerous in the village. 

A weekly fair in every Saturday at Pethri allows farmers and other petty merchants to sell their items.

See also
 Udupi
 Districts of Karnataka

References

External links
 http://Udupi.nic.in/

Villages in Udupi district